"Twerkulator" is a song recorded by American hip hop duo City Girls. It was released on May 21, 2021, through Quality Control, Motown and Capitol.

Background and release

In March 2021, Yung Miami, one of the members of the duo, said that "Twerkulator" couldn't be released due to the instrumental it uses not being cleared. In May, JT, the other member of the duo, revealed that the instrumental was cleared and that the song could be released.

"Twerkulator" follows the release of City Girls' second studio album, City on Lock. The song went viral on TikTok prior to its release. A music video directed by Missy Elliott was released for the song.

Composition
"Twerkulator" makes usage of the instrumental of the 1982 song "Planet Rock" by Afrika Bambaataa, which in turn samples Kraftwerk's "Trans-Europe Express". It also interpolates the lyric from "Percolator" by Cajmere.

Reception
In an interview with Vice, rapper Trick Daddy opined that "Twerkulator" was "on pace to become the song of the summer".

Accolades

Charts

Weekly charts

Year-end charts

Certifications

References

2021 songs
2021 singles
City Girls songs
Songs written by Arthur Baker (musician)
Songs written by John Robie
Songs written by Ralf Hütter
Songs written by Emil Schult
Capitol Records singles
Motown singles